This is a list of judges of the Federal Administrative Court of Switzerland.

Division I: Infrastructure, Finance and Personnel

Division II: Economy, Education and Competition

Division III: Foreigners, Health and Social Security

Division IV: Asylum Law

Division V: Asylum Law

References
 Election records for the 2007-12 term of office, Official Bulletin of the Swiss Federal Assembly, AB/BO 2005 N 1541 et seq.
 For party affiliations: List provided courtesy of the Secretariat of the Judicial Committee of the Swiss Federal Assembly.

Notes

Administrative Court, List of judges
Federal